is a Japanese politician who was Deputy Prime Minister of Japan from January to December 2012. A member of the House of Representatives of Japan, he was the President of the Democratic Party, and previously of the Democratic Party of Japan. He also served as Secretary-General of the DPJ three times. During the DPJ's period in government he was Foreign Minister of Japan.

In 2016, he remained as leader when the Democratic Party of Japan merged with the Japan Innovation Party to become the Democratic Party.

Early life and education
Okada was born on 14 July 1953. He is the second son of Takuya Okada, who is a co-founder of AEON Group. His elder brother, Motoya Okada, is the President and CEO of AEON Group. He has a younger brother and a half-sister. A native of Yokkaichi, Mie, Okada graduated from the University of Tokyo with a degree in law, and entered the Ministry of International Trade and Industry. He also did a short course at Weatherhead Center for International Affairs in Harvard University.

Political career 

Okada ran for the House of Representatives at the 1990 general election from LDP, representing Mie Prefecture's third district, and later joined the Takeshita faction of the Liberal Democratic Party, and followed faction leaders Tsutomu Hata and Ichirō Ozawa to join the Japan Renewal Party in 1993. Through a series of splits and mergers, Okada then became a member of the New Frontier Party, Sun Party, and Minseito, finally entering the DPJ upon its merger with Minseito in 1998.

He became president of the DPJ on 18 May 2004, and led the DPJ to one of its largest electoral victories in history during the 2004 House of Councillors election. However, he resigned after his party suffered dramatic losses in the September 2005 general election.

Okada ran for the presidency in 2009 but lost to Yukio Hatoyama. Following the success of the DPJ in the 2009 general election, Hatoyama selected Okada to be the foreign minister.

Okada was regarded as a possible successor of Hatoyama when Hatoyama announced his resignation as Prime Minister and DPJ leader in June 2010, but Okada gave his support to Finance Minister Naoto Kan, who quickly emerged as the likely successor to Hatoyama. Ichirō Ozawa, however, whose resignation had also been reported announced by Hatoyama, was still supporting another less well known possible successor, Shinji Tarutoko, 50, a legislator who leads the environmental policy committee in the lower house of Parliament, a day before the DPJ leadership elections. After being selected as the new prime minister, Kan reaffirmed Okada as foreign minister.

As foreign minister, Okada was one of the chief participants in negotiations with the United States (US) over the relocation of Marine Corps Air Station Futenma on Okinawa. The Foreign Ministry under Okada also confirmed the existence of a long-rumored secret pact between Japan and US which had allowed the US military to carry nuclear weapons into Japanese territory in contravention of the Treaty of Mutual Cooperation and Security between the United States and Japan. The previous administration under the LDP had denied that such a pact existed.

In a September 2010 cabinet reshuffle, Okada was moved from foreign minister to secretary general of the DPJ. Okada, who is viewed as an intraparty ally of Prime Minister Naoto Kan, is believed to have been given the role of secretary general in order to secure Kan's influence in the governing party, as well as to help force the passage of government bills in parliament.

Okada ran in the DPJ leadership election held in January 2015 after former president Banri Kaieda resigned after losing his seat. Okada won and returned as DPJ leader after a period of nine years.

In 2016, he remained as leader when the Democratic Party of Japan merged with the Japan Innovation Party to become the Democratic Party. Following the party's defeat at the House of Councillors election in July, he announced that he would not seek re-election as leader at the party's annual meeting in September.

He was many times interviewed by Sekai Nippo, the official newspaper of the Unification Church, an anti-communism new religion.
He does not support marriage equality.

Other interests
Okada is said to be an avid collector of frog knick knacks, which decorate his office.

See also
Aeon Group
Chunichi Shimbun - Japanese left-leaning local newspaper. His younger brother Masaya Takada is an employee of the newspaper.
New Frontier Party
Neoliberalism
Sekai Nippo

References

External links
 for Okada

|-

|-

|-

|-

|-

|-

1953 births
Living people
Aeon Group
Deputy Prime Ministers of Japan
Foreign ministers of Japan
Government ministers of Japan
Members of the House of Representatives (Japan)
People from Yokkaichi
Liberal Democratic Party (Japan) politicians
New Frontier Party (Japan) politicians
20th-century Japanese politicians
Sun Party politicians
Good Governance Party politicians
Democratic Party of Japan politicians
Noda cabinet
University of Tokyo alumni
21st-century Japanese politicians
Politicians from Mie Prefecture